Megachile karatauensis is a species of bee in the family Megachilidae. It was described by Tkalcu in 1988.

References

Karatauensis
Insects described in 1988